A flame test is an analytical procedure used in chemistry to detect the presence of certain elements, primarily metal ions, based on each element's characteristic flame emission spectrum (which may be affected by the presence of chloride ion).  The color of flames in general also depends on temperature and oxygen fed; see flame color.

Process 

The test involves introducing a sample of the element or compound to a hot, non-luminous flame, and observing the color of the flame that results. The idea of the test is that sample atoms evaporate and since they are hot, they emit light when being in flame. The solvent of the solution evaporates first, leaving finely divided solid particles which move to the hottest region of the flame where gaseous atoms and ions are produced through the dissociation of molecules. Here electrons are excited by the heat, and the spontaneously emit photon to decay to lower energy states. 

Bulk sample emits light too, but its light is not good for analysis. Bulk samples emit light with hydrochloric acid to remove traces of previous analytes. The compound is usually made into a paste with concentrated hydrochloric acid, as metal halides, being volatile, give better results. Different flames should be tried to avoid wrong data due to "contaminated" flames, or occasionally to verify the accuracy of the color. In high-school chemistry courses, wooden splints are sometimes used, mostly because solutions can be dried onto them, and they are inexpensive. Nichrome wire is also sometimes used. When using a splint, one must be careful to wave the splint through the flame rather than holding it in the flame for extended periods, to avoid setting the splint itself on fire. The use of cotton swab or melamine foam (used in "eraser" cleaning sponges) as a support has also been suggested.

Sodium is a common component or contaminant in many compounds and its spectrum tends to dominate over others. The test flame is often viewed through cobalt blue glass to filter out the yellow of sodium and allow for easier viewing of other metal ions.

Results 

The flame test is relatively quick and simple to perform and can be carried out with the basic equipment found in most chemistry laboratories. However, the range of elements positively detectable under these conditions is small, as the test relies on the subjective experience of the experimenter rather than any objective measurements. The test has difficulty detecting small concentrations of some elements, while too strong a result may be produced for certain others, which tends to cause fainter colors to not appear.

Although the flame test only gives qualitative information, not quantitative data about the proportion of elements in the sample, quantitative data can be obtained by the related techniques of flame photometry or flame emission spectroscopy. Flame atomic absorption spectroscopy Instruments, made by e.g. PerkinElmer or Shimadzu, can be operated in emission mode according to the instrument manuals.

Common elements 

Some common elements and their corresponding colors are:

Gold, silver, platinum, palladium, and a number of other elements do not produce a characteristic flame color, although some may produce sparks (as do metallic titanium and iron); salts of beryllium and gold reportedly deposit pure metal on cooling.

See also 
 Bead test
 Spark testing
 Colored fire
 Emission spectrum
 Photoelectric flame photometer
 Qualitative inorganic analysis
 Inductively coupled plasma atomic emission spectroscopy

References

External links 

Flame Test - Coloring Fire - Pictures of Several Flame Tests, Includes Instructions
WebMineral.com - Flame Coloration by Element

Chemical tests
Chemistry classroom experiments
Fire